ESHAP is an acronym for relatively intensive chemotherapy regimen that is used for salvage therapy in relapsed or refractory lymphomas and Hodgkin's lymphoma. In combination with monoclonal antibody Rituximab it is called R-ESHAP or ESHAP-R.

R-ESHAP consists of:
 Rituximab, an anti-CD20-directed monoclonal antibody that kills both normal and malignant B-lymphocytes
 Etoposide, an epipodophyllotoxin topoisomerase inhibitor
 Solu-Medrol - Methylprednisolone, which is a glucocorticoid that can lyse lymphocytes
 High-dose Ara-C - cytarabine
 Platinol - Cisplatin, a platinum-based antineoplastic agent, also an alkylating antineoplastic agent.

Dosing regimen

References

Chemotherapy regimens used in lymphoma